Hugh Clifton was an English actor of the silent era born in London.

Selected filmography
 John Forrest Finds Himself (1920)
 Mr. Justice Raffles (1921)
 Tansy (1921)
 The Narrow Valley (1921)
 Dollars in Surrey (1921)
 The Lunatic at Large (1921)
 The Tinted Venus (1921)
 Simple Simon (1922)

References

External links

Year of birth unknown
Year of death unknown
English male silent film actors
20th-century English male actors
English male film actors
Male actors from London
20th-century British male actors